Meiling Subdistrict is a subdistrict in Hanjiang District, Yangzhou, Jiangsu, China. , it has 7 residential communities under its administration.

See also 
 List of township-level divisions of Jiangsu

References 

Township-level divisions of Jiangsu
Hanjiang District, Yangzhou